"Come Away, Death" is a song by the fool Feste from Shakespeare's Twelfth Night.

Come Away, Death may also refer to:

Books
 Come Away, Death (novel), 1937 mystery novel by Gladys Mitchell

Songs
There are multiple musical settings to Shakespeare's words, amongst them:
"Come Away, Death", song by Benjamin Dale
"Come Away, Death", song by Gerald Finzi from his cycle Let Us Garlands Bring
"Come Away, Death", song by Jaakko Mäntyjärvi
"Come Away, Death", song by Roger Quilter
"Come Away, Come Away, Death", song by Glenarvon from the album Smashing Idols